Tchaikovsky and its feminine variant  Tchaikovskaya  is a common transliteration (via French language) of the Russian language surname Чайковский. The surname itself is a Russian-language variant of the Polish surname Czajkowski, see this page for name origin. 

Transliterated spellings in various languages include Tschaikowski (German), Ciajkovskij (Italian), Tsjaikovski (Dutch), Csajkovszkij (Hungarian), Chaikovski (Spanish), Tjajkovskij (Swedish), Tsjajkovskij (Norwegian), Čaikovskis (Latvian and Lithuanian), Tchaikovski (Portuguese), Txaikovski (Catalan) and Tšaikovski (Estonian and Finnish).  

It has also been rendered as Tchaikovski, Chaikovsky, Chaykovsky, Chaikovskiy, Chaykovskiy, and Chaikovskii. Among Slavic languages which use the Latin alphabet, it frequently occurs in its Polish version, Czajkowski, or as Čajkovskij (Czech and Slovak) and Čajkovski (Slovenian, Croatian, Bosnian). 

The surname as transliterated into other languages may refer to the following persons. For the original, Polish spelling, see Czajkowski (surname).

André Tchaikowsky (also Andrzej Czajkowski; born Robert Andrzej Krauthammer; 1935–1982), Polish classical pianist and composer
Adrian Tchaikovsky (1972–present), British fantasy writer of Polish extraction
Beny Tchaicovsky (1954–2009), painter and musician
Boris Tchaikovsky (1925–1996), Russian classical composer
Bram Tchaikovsky (born 1950), English lead vocalist and guitarist for the eponymous power pop band; original name Peter Bramall
Kasyan Chaykovsky (1893–1938), Russian military commander; comcor in World War I; executed in Stalinist purge; rehabilitated 1956 
Modest Ilyich Tchaikovsky (1850–1916), Russian playwright and opera librettist; brother of Pyotr Ilyich Tchaikovsky
Nikolai Tchaikovsky (1851–1926), Russian writer of influential revolutionary socialist tracts
Pyotr Ilyich Tchaikovsky (1840–1893), Russian classical composer
Ivan Chaikivskyi

Similar surnames
Israel Lyon Chaikoff (1902–1966), Canadian-American physiologist
Joseph Chaikov (1888–1979), Ukrainian sculptor

See also
Tchaikovsky (disambiguation)

be-x-old:Чайкоўскі (неадназначнасьць)

Russian-language surnames
Toponymic surnames
Surnames of Polish origin

de:Tschaikowski (Begriffsklärung)
fr:Tchaïkovski (homonymie)
it:Čajkovskij
nl:Tsjaikovski
ru:Чайковский (значения)